Themisto may refer to:

Greek mythology 
 Themisto, the third and last wife of Athamas
 Themisto (mythology), various figures including:
 Themisto, a daughter of the river god Inachus, who became the mother of Arcas by Zeus
 Themisto, one of the Nereids
 Themisto, daughter of the Hyperborean king Zabius, mother of Galeos by Apollo

Other meanings 
 Themisto (moon) of Jupiter
 Themisto (crustacean), a genus of amphipod crustaceans

See also 
 Themistocles (disambiguation)